This is a list of foreign ministers in 2018.

Africa
  - Abdelkader Messahel (2017–2019)
  - Manuel Domingos Augusto (2017–2020)
  - Aurélien Agbénonci (2016–present)
  - 
Pelonomi Venson-Moitoi (2014–2018)
Vincent T. Seretse (2018)
Unity Dow (2018–2020)
  - Alpha Barry (2016–2021)
  -
Alain Aimé Nyamitwe (2015–2018)
Ezéchiel Nibigira (2018–2020)
 -  Lejeune Mbella Mbella (2015–present)
  - Luís Felipe Tavares (2016–2021)
  -
Charles-Armel Doubane (2016–2018)
Sylvie Baïpo-Temon (2018–present)
  - Mahamat Zene Cherif (2017–2020)
  - Mohamed El-Amine Souef (2017–2020)
  - Jean-Claude Gakosso (2015–present)
  - Léonard She Okitundu (2016–2019)
  - Mahamoud Ali Youssouf (2005–present)
  - Sameh Shoukry (2014–present)
  -
 Agapito Mba Mokuy (2012–2018)
 Simeón Oyono Esono Angue (2018–present)
  - Osman Saleh Mohammed (2007–present)
  - Workneh Gebeyehu (2016–2019)
  -
Noël Nelson Messone (2017–2018)
Régis Immongault Tatangani (2018–present)
  -
Ousainou Darboe (2017–2018)
Mamadou Tangara (2018–2019)
  - Shirley Ayorkor Botchway (2017–present)
  - Mamadi Touré (2017–2021)
  -
Jorge Malú (2016–2018)
João Ribeiro Butiam Có (2018–2019)
  - Marcel Amon Tanoh (acting to 2017) (2016–2020)
  -
Amina Mohamed (2013–2018)
Monica Juma (2018–2020)
  - Lesego Makgothi (2017–2020)
  -
Marjon Kamara (2016–2018)
Gbehzohngar Findley (2018–2020)

Government of  House of Representatives of Libya (Government of Libya internationally recognized to 2016) - Mohammed al-Dairi (2014–2019)
 Government of National Accord of Libya (Interim government internationally recognized as the sole legitimate government of Libya from 2016) - Mohamed Taha Siala (2016–2021)
  -
 Henry Rabary Njaka (2017–2018)
 Eloi Maxime Alphonse (2018–2019)
  - Emmanuel Fabiano (2017–2019)
  -
Tiéman Coulibaly (2017–2018)
Kamissa Camara  (2018–2019)
  -
 Isselkou Ould Ahmed Izid Bih (2016–2018)
 Ismail Ould Cheikh Ahmed (2018–present)
  - Vishnu Lutchmeenaraidoo (2016–2019)
  - Nasser Bourita  (2017–present)
  - José Condungua Pacheco (2017–2020)
  - Netumbo Nandi-Ndaitwah (2012–present)
  -
Ibrahim Yacouba (2016–2018)
Kalla Ankourao (2018–2020)
  - Geoffrey Onyeama (2015–present)
  - 
Louise Mushikiwabo (2009–2018)
Richard Sezibera (2018–2019)
  -
Urbino Botelho (2016–2018)
Elsa Teixeira Pinto (2018–2020)
  - Sidiki Kaba (2017–2019)
  - Vincent Meriton (2018–2020)
  -
Kaifala Marah (2017–2018)
Alie Kabba (2018–2019)
  - 
Yusuf Garaad Omar (2017–2018)
Ahmed Isse Awad (2018–2020)
  - 
Saad Ali Shire (2015–2018)
Yasin Haji Mohamoud (2018–present)
  -
Maite Nkoana-Mashabane (2009–2018)
Lindiwe Sisulu (2018–2019)
  -
Deng Alor (2016–2018)
Martin Elia Lomuro (acting) (2018)
Nhial Deng Nhial (2018–2019)
  -
Ibrahim Ghandour (2015–2018)
Mohamed Abdalla Idris (acting)(2018)
al-Dirdiri Mohamed Ahmed (2018–2019)
  –
Mgwagwa Gamedze (2013–2018)
Joel Musa Nhleko (acting) (2018)
Thuli Dladla (2018–present)
  - Augustine Mahiga (2015–2019)
  - Robert Dussey (2013–present)
  - Khemaies Jhinaoui (2016–2019)
  - Sam Kutesa (2005–2021)
  - Mohamed Salem Ould Salek (1998–2023)
  -
 Harry Kalaba (2014–2018)
 Joe Malanji (2018–2021)
  - Sibusiso Moyo (2017–2021)

Asia
  - Daur Kove (2016–2021)
  - Salahuddin Rabbani (2015–2019)
  -
Eduard Nalbandyan (2008–2018)
Zohrab Mnatsakanian (2018–2020)
  - Masis Mayilyan (2017–2021)
  - Elmar Mammadyarov (2004–2020)
  - Sheikh Khalid ibn Ahmad Al Khalifah (2005–2020)
  - Abul Hassan Mahmud Ali (2014–2019)
  -
Damcho Dorji (2015-2018)
Dasho Tshering Wangchuk (acting) (2018)
Tandi Dorji (2018-present)
  - Hassanal Bolkiah (2015–present)
  - Prak Sokhon (2016–present)
  - Wang Yi (2013–present)
  – 
Aurélio Guterres (2017–2018)
Dionísio Babo Soares (2018–2020)
  -
Mikheil Janelidze (2015–2018)
Davit Zalkaliani (2018–present)
  - Sushma Swaraj (2014–2019)
  - Retno Marsudi (2014–present)
  - Mohammad Javad Zarif (2013–2021)
  -
Ibrahim al-Jaafari (2014–2018)
Mohamed Ali Alhakim (2018–2020)
  - Falah Mustafa Bakir (2006–2019)
  - Benjamin Netanyahu (2015–2019)
  - Tarō Kōno (2017–2019)
  - Ayman Safadi (2017–present)
  –
Kairat Abdrakhmanov (2016–2018)
Beibut Atamkulov (2018–2019)
  - Ri Yong-ho (2016–2020)
  - Kang Kyung-wha (2017–2021)
  - Sheikh Sabah Al-Khalid Al-Sabah (2011–2019)
  - 
Erlan Abdyldayev (2012–2018)
Chingiz Aidarbekov (2018–2020)
  - Saleumxay Kommasith (2016–present)
  - Gebran Bassil (2014–2020)
  - 
Anifah Aman (2009–2018)
Saifuddin Abdullah (2018-2020)
  -
Mohamed Asim (2016–2018)
Abdulla Shahid (2018–present)
  - Damdin Tsogtbaatar (2017–2020)
  - Aung San Suu Kyi (2016–2021)
 
see under Artsakh
  -
Sher Bahadur Deuba (2017–2018)
Pradeep Gyawali (2018–2021)
  - Yusuf bin Alawi bin Abdullah (1982–2020)
  -
 Khawaja Muhammad Asif (2017–2018)
 Tehmina Janjua (acting)  (2018)
 Khurram Dastgir Khan (2018)
 Hussain Haroon (2018)
 Shah Mehmood Qureshi (2018–present)
  - Riyad al-Maliki (2007–present)
   -
 Alan Peter Cayetano (2017–2018)
 Teodoro Locsin Jr. (2018–2022)
  - Sheikh Mohammed bin Abdulrahman Al Thani (2016–present)

  -
Adel al-Jubeir (2015–2018)
Ibrahim Abdulaziz Al-Assaf (2018–2019)
  - Vivian Balakrishnan (2015–present)
  - Dmitry Medoyev (2017–present)
  - 
Tilak Marapana (2017–2018)
Sarath Amunugama (2018)
Tilak Marapana (2018–2019)
  - Walid Muallem (2006–2020)
  -
David Lee (2016–2018)
Joseph Wu (2018–present)
  - Sirodjidin Aslov (2013–present)
  - Don Pramudwinai (2015–present)
  -
Aurélio Guterres (2017–2018)
Dionísio Babo (2018–present)
  - Mevlüt Çavuşoğlu (2015–present)
  - Raşit Meredow (2001–present)
  - Sheikh Abdullah bin Zayed Al Nahyan (2006–present)
  - Abdulaziz Komilov (2012–present)
  - Phạm Bình Minh (2011–2021)

Republic of Yemen -
Abdulmalik Al-Mekhlafi (2015–2018)
Khaled al-Yamani (2018–2019)
Supreme Political Council (unrecognised, rival government) - Hisham Abdullah (2016-present)

Europe
  - Ditmir Bushati (2013–2019)
  - Maria Ubach Font (2017–present)
  – Karin Kneissl (2017–2019)
  - Vladimir Makei (2012–present)
  - Didier Reynders (2011–2019)
  - Guy Vanhengel (2013–2019)
  - Geert Bourgeois (2014–2019)
  Wallonia - Willy Borsus (2017–2019)
  - Igor Crnadak (2015–2019)
  – Ekaterina Zakharieva (2017–2021)
  - Marija Pejčinović Burić (2017–2019)
  -
Ioannis Kasoulidis (2013–2018)
Nikos Christodoulidis (2018–2022)
  -
Martin Stropnický (2017–2018)
Jan Hamáček (acting) (2018)
Tomáš Petříček (2018–2021)
  - Anders Samuelsen (2016–2019)
  - Poul Michelsen (2015–2019)
  Donetsk People's Republic - Natalya Nikonorova (2016–present)
  - Sven Mikser (2016–2019)
  - Timo Soini (2015–2019)
  - Jean-Yves Le Drian (2017–present)
  -
Sigmar Gabriel (2017-2018)
Heiko Maas (2018–2021)
  -
Nikos Kotzias (2015–2018)
Alexis Tsipras (2018–2019)
Georgios Katrougalos (2019-present)
  - Jonathan Le Tocq (2016–present)
  - Péter Szijjártó (2014–present)
  - Guðlaugur Þór Þórðarson (2017–2021)
  - Simon Coveney (2017–present)
  -
Angelino Alfano (2016–2018)
Enzo Moavero Milanesi (2018–2019)
  -
 Sir Philip Bailhache (2013–2018)
 Ian Gorst (2018–present)
  - Behgjet Pacolli (2017–2020)
  - Edgars Rinkēvičs (2011–present)
  - Aurelia Frick (2009–2019)
  - Linas Antanas Linkevičius (2012–2020)
  Lugansk People's Republic - Vladislav Deinevo (2017–present)
  - Jean Asselborn (2004–present)
  - Nikola Dimitrov (2017–2020)
  - Carmelo Abela (2017–2020)
  -
Andrei Galbur (2016–2018)
Tudor Ulianovschi (2018–present)
  Gagauzia - Vitaliy Vlah (2015–present)
  - Gilles Tonelli (2015–2019)
  - Srđan Darmanović (2016–2020)
  -
Halbe Zijlstra (2017–2018)
Sigrid Kaag (acting) (2018)
Stef Blok (2018–2021)
  -
Tahsin Ertuğruloğlu (2016–2018)
Kudret Özersay (2018–2020)
  - Ine Marie Eriksen Søreide (2017–2021)
  -
 Witold Waszczykowski (2015–2018)
 Jacek Czaputowicz (2018–2020)
  - Augusto Santos Silva (2015–2022)
  - Teodor Meleșcanu (2017–2019)
  - Sergey Lavrov (2004–present)
  - Nicola Renzi (2016–2020)
  - Ivica Dačić (2014–2020)
  - Miroslav Lajčák (2012–2020)
  -
Karl Erjavec (2012–2018)
Miro Cerar (2018–2020)
  -
Alfonso Dastis (2016–2018)
Josep Borrell (2018–present)
 
Ernest Maragall (2018–2019)
Alfred Bosch (2019-2020)
  - Margot Wallström (2014–2019)
  - Ignazio Cassis (2017–present)
  - Vitaly Ignatyev (2015–present)

  - Pavlo Klimkin (2014–2019)
  -
Boris Johnson (2016–2018)
Jeremy Hunt (2018–2019)
  - Fiona Hyslop (2009–2020)
  - Archbishop Paul Gallagher (2014–present)

North America and the Caribbean
  -
Charles Fernandez (2014–2018)
E.P. Chet Greene (2018–present)
  - Darren Henfield (2017–2021)
  -
Maxine McClean (2008–2018)
Jerome Walcott (2018–present)
  - Wilfred Elrington (2008–2020)
  - Chrystia Freeland (2017–2019)
  Quebec -
 Christine St-Pierre (2014–2018)
 Nadine Girault (2018–present)
  -
Manuel González Sanz (2014–2018)
Epsy Campbell Barr (2018)
Lorena Aguilar Revelo (acting) (2018–2019)
  - Bruno Rodríguez Parrilla (2009–present)
  - Francine Baron (2014–2019)
  - Miguel Vargas Maldonado (2016–2020)
  -
 Hugo Martínez (2014–2018)
 Carlos Alfredo Castaneda (2018–2019)
  Greenland –
 Suka K. Frederiksen (2017–2018)
 Vivian Motzfeldt (2018)
 Ane Lone Bagger (2018–2020)
  -
 Elvin Nimrod (2016–2018)
 Peter David (2018–2020)
 - Sandra Jovel (2017–2020)
  -
Antonio Rodrigue (2017–2018)
Bocchit Edmond (2018–2020)
  - María Dolores Agüero (2016–2019)
  - Kamina Johnson-Smith (2016–present)
  -
Luis Videgaray Caso (2017–2018)
Marcelo Ebrard (2018–present)
  –Denis Moncada (2017–present)
  - Isabel Saint Malo (2014–2019)
  – Luis G. Rivera Marín (2017–2019)
  - Mark Brantley (2015–present)
  - Allen Chastanet (2016–2021)
  - Sir Louis Straker (2015–2020)
  - Dennis Moses (2015–2020)
  -
Rex Tillerson (2017–2018)
John J. Sullivan (acting) (2018)
Mike Pompeo (2018–2021)

Oceania
  -
 Julie Bishop (2013–2018)
 Marise Payne (2018–present)
  - Henry Puna (2013–2020)
  - Frank Bainimarama (2016–2019)
   - Édouard Fritch (2014–present)
  - Taneti Mamau (2016–present)
  - John Silk (2016–2020)
  - Lorin S. Robert (2007–2019)
  - Baron Waqa (2013–2019)
  - Winston Peters (2017–2020)
  - Toke Talagi (2008–2020)
  – Faustina Rehuher-Marugg (2017–2021)
  - Rimbink Pato (2012–2019)
  - Tuilaepa Aiono Sailele Malielegaoi (1998–2021)
  - Milner Tozaka (2014–2019)
  – 
Siopili Perez (2017–2018)
Afega Gaualofa (2018–2019)
  –
Siaosi Sovaleni (2017–2018)
ʻAkilisi Pōhiva (2018–2019)
  - Taukelina Finikaso (2013–2019)
  – Ralph Regenvanu (2017–2020)

South America
  - Jorge Faurie (2017–2019)
  -
Fernando Huanacuni Mamani (2017–2018)
Diego Pary (2018–2019)
  - Aloysio Nunes (2017–2019)
  -
Heraldo Muñoz (2014–2018)
Roberto Ampuero (2018–2019)
  -
María Ángela Holguín (2010–2018)
Carlos Holmes Trujillo (2018–2019)
  -
María Fernanda Espinosa (2017–2018)
José Valencia Amores (2018–2020)
  - Carl Greenidge (2015-2019)
  -
Eladio Loizaga (2013–2018)
Luis Castiglioni (2018–2019)
  -
 Ricardo Luna (2016–2018)
 Cayetana Aljovín (2018)
 Néstor Popolizio (2018–2019)
  - Yldiz Pollack-Beighle (2017–2020)
  - Rodolfo Nin Novoa (2015–2020)
  - Jorge Arreaza (2017–2021)

See also
List of current foreign ministers

References

External links
http://rulers.org

Foreign ministers
2018 in international relations

Foreign ministers
2018